The following radio stations broadcast on FM frequency 88.2 MHz:

China 
 CNR The Voice of China in Panjin

Malaysia
 Hot FM in Alor Setar, Kedah and Penang

New Zealand
Various low-power stations up to 1 watt

Turkey
 TRT-3 at Istanbul

United Kingdom
 BBC Radio 2 (Betws Y Coed, Bexhill, Calne, Elgin, Gloucestershire, Newbury, South West Wales)

References

Lists of radio stations by frequency